Ed Feingersh (1925–1961) studied photography under Alexey Brodovitch at the New School of Social Research. He later worked as a photojournalist for the Pix Publishing agency. His talent for available light photography under seemingly impossible conditions was well recognised. His pictures of Marilyn Monroe are his best known, but he was a prolific photojournalist throughout the 1950s. Two of his moody photographs of jazz performers were selected by Edward Steichen for MoMA’s world-touring The Family of Man exhibition.

Career
 Edwin (a.k.a. Edward, commonly 'Ed' or 'Eddie') Feingersh was born in Brooklyn on April 21, 1925, the second of three sons of Harry Feingersh, a women's fashion designer and Rae Feingersh (née Press). His Jewish grandfather Abraham, a tailor, migrated to America from Moldavia in 1913 to escape the pogroms. Ed Feingersh majored in art at Manhattan's Haaren High School.

He took up photography during while serving in Germany in the Army, where he bought an inexpensive 35-mm camera. After the war, with the assistance of the G.I. Bill, he first attended New York University, where he joined the camera club, and later enrolled in Alexey Brodovitch's photography course at the New School for Social Research. He worked during this period as assistant to Gjon Mili. This experience, and photographs he took for the course secured work as a 22-year-old stringer with Pix Publishing photo agency in 1948. For them he produced stories for major magazines including a day in the life of a woman doctor for McCall's, moody and revealing scenes from a Tokyo night club for Argosy men's magazine, a report on German war orphans for Redbook, a study of a disturbed boy's psychological rehabilitation and the story "The Great Rock 'n' Roll Controversy', both for Look, in addition to making a portrait series of Albert Schweitzer in New York and covering a night fighter squadron's mission over Greenland.

His coverage of the Korean War, particularly the Battle of Pork Chop Hill (1953), involved Feingersh carrying in addition to his cameras, the gun, pack, and other standard G.I. equipment, nevertheless, he produced imagery with his wide-angle lens that conveyed a charged, first-person perspective. The work was published in Pageant and Argosy. He developed a reputation for putting himself at risk to get the eye-catching shot the magazine editors craved; parachuting with paratroopers, lying right in the path of stunt cars and having himself tied to the periscope to photograph a submarine diving.

At PIX he worked alongside the agency photographers Alfred Eisenstaedt, George Karger, Jerry Cooke, Eileen Darby (Lester), Robert and Cornell Capa, George Zimbel, Bob Schwalberg, Lawrence Fried, Bob Henriquez, and Garry Winogrand whom Feingersh introduced to the photo agency.

Marilyn Monroe

Ed Feingersh photographed Marilyn Monroe for Redbook magazine in March 1955 for a story which would follow Monroe through her daily routine, the photography to be candid and shot without flash in available light. The actress and her new production-company partner Milton Greene recommended him to the magazine as their choice.

The photographs he made of her during the week March 24–30, 1955 as she prepares for two appearances; opening night of Cat on a Hot Tin Roof at the Morosco Theatre, and being fitted with a burlesque corset for her ride on a pink elephant at a charity event at Madison Square Garden, were the only candid images of the actress made specifically for publication. An example is a wide angle shot of the corseted Monroe reflected in a mirror contains an out-of-focus self-portrait of the photographer holding a Nikon S2 fitted with 35mm lens, the rangefinder camera he customarily used and which was starting then to be adopted by picture magazines in America previously wary of Japanese equipment.

Redbook asked him to repeat the exercise in 1957, and he accepted their assignment to photograph Audrey Hepburn and Mel Ferrier in Paris, again candidly, capturing their actions in dance rehearsals under difficult low-light conditions requiring shutter speeds of 1/15 sec. and lower.

In 2013 Chanel ran an advertising campaign using a recorded interview with Monroe in which she is asked about her use of Chanel No.5 fragrance. It featured Feingersh's photograph of the actress splashing herself with a bottle of the perfume.

Late career and legacy

Robert Stein, then editor of Redbook magazine and later, president of the American Society of Magazine Editors,  was a close friend of the photographer. He reports (in 2005) that Feingersh suffered depression between his bouts of frenetic activity, and in the years immediately after the Monroe shoot, and after a brief, failed marriage (1957) to Miriam (Mimi) Sakol (b.1933), he gave up photography.

Stein subsequently invited him to join him at Redbook as picture editor, but Feingersh soon succumbed to alcoholism, poor mental and physical health, neglected his work and died 'in his sleep' on the morning of June 21, 1961, at the home of friends in New York. He was buried in the family plot at Prospect Park in Brooklyn.

Full of praise for his colleague's photography, Stein says that though many want to see 'Eddie's' work in public collections of 'museums to give him the recognition he deserves'. His collection is now in the archives of Life Magazine and  Getty Images and in the process of being edited and scanned, many of which can be found on gettyimages.com.

In 1987, 26 years after Ed Feingersh died, photography collector Michael Ochs uncovered a cache of several rolls of negatives and proofs that revealed the unpublished images from the Monroe series. This collection is held by Getty Images and consequently they are the most seen of Feingersh's photojournalistic output, accessed via countless Monroe fansites.

Books

Selected articles illustrated by Ed Feingersh

 Argosy's Tips from Photographers, (cl) Argosy Jul 1952 
 Argosy's Tips from Photographers: Mistakes That Make Pictures, (cl) Argosy Jul 1953 
 Dave Chambers’ $2,000,000 Worth of Horses, (pi) Argosy Mar 1955
 The Hot-Seat Drag, (pi) Argosy Jul 1954
 How Red China Gets Dope to Our GIs, (pi) Argosy Feb 1954
 Irish Horan's Hell Drivers, (pi) Argosy Jun 1953
 The Last Patrol, (pi) Argosy Dec 1953
 Mistakes That Make Pictures, (cl) Argosy Jul 1953
 Nice Work If You Can Get It, (pi) Argosy May 1954
 Pictures Tell the Story: The Hot-Seat Drag, (pi) Argosy Jul 1954 
 Pictures Tell the Story: The Last Patrol, (pi) Argosy Dec 1953
 What will happen to this boy?, produced by George B. Leonard, Jr., Look, v. 19, no. 21 (October 18, 1955), p. 137-144. 15 images.
 The Private Takes a Wife, (pi) Redbook Dec 1955
 Vice Squad, (pi) Adventure Dec 1954
 The great rock 'n' roll controversy, Look, v. 20, no. 13 (June 26, 1956), p. 40-41, 42, 45, 47. 12 images 
 Mike Wallace, Look, March 21, 1957
 You Can't Miss! (with Robert Bridgeport), (ar) Argosy Mar 1959

Bibliography

 Russel, J. (1989). Marilyn Monroe and the camera. Bulfinch P. Books.
 Greer, H. (2001). Immortalizing the ephemeral. The World & I, 16(6), 84.
 Zoom (NL) 1990, I/1, p. 38-45 (NFM)
 Van Ham Kunstauktionen: Photographie 254. Auktion, 11. Mai 2007 (2007) (NFM)

References

American photojournalists
Sports photographers
American war photographers
1925 births
1961 deaths
American people of Moldovan-Jewish descent
Photographers from New York (state)
People from Brooklyn
Haaren High School alumni